Zdravka Yordanova (born 9 December 1950) is a Bulgarian rower and Olympic champion.

She became Olympic champion in 1976 in the double sculls class, together with Svetla Otsetova. She also competed at the 1980 Summer Olympics.

References

External links

1950 births
Living people
Bulgarian female rowers
Olympic rowers of Bulgaria
Rowers at the 1976 Summer Olympics
Rowers at the 1980 Summer Olympics
Olympic gold medalists for Bulgaria
Olympic medalists in rowing
World Rowing Championships medalists for Bulgaria
Medalists at the 1976 Summer Olympics